Xenosoma geometrina is a moth in the Arctiidae family and subfamily Arctiinae first described by William Schaus in 1910. It is found in Costa Rica.

References

Arctiinae